Ingramport  is a rural community of Halifax in the Canadian province of Nova Scotia.

References
 Explore HRM

Communities in Halifax, Nova Scotia
Populated coastal places in Canada